Yaikel Pérez Rousseaux (born February 17, 1985) is a Cuban football player who most recently played for MASL side Harrisburg Heat. He was terminated midseason for fighting

Career

Club
Perez played youth soccer for his local club, Ciudad Habana, and was part of the Cuban national team which qualified for the 2005 CONCACAF Gold Cup. Along with several of his teammates he defected to the United States during the final qualifying phase, and eventually signed for USL First Division expansion team Miami FC in 2006.

After being released by Miami Perez briefly played for Laredo Heat in the USL Premier Development League before moving to Puerto Rico, where he played for Atlético de San Juan and Sevilla FC Puerto Rico in the new Puerto Rico Soccer League from 2007 to 2009, making 48 appearances and scoring 16 goals for Sevilla, and helping them to the league title in 2008.

On March 9, 2010, Crystal Palace Baltimore announced the signing of Perez to a contract for the 2010 season. Perez played 17 games and scored 1 goal for Baltimore before the team ceased operations at the end of the season.

He transferred to River Plate Puerto Rico in the USL Professional Division in 2011, but played just three games before the team was removed from USL Pro due to financial difficulties. He moved to Puerto Rico Islanders in the North American Soccer League in June, and made his debut for his new team on June 1 in a 1–1 tie with the NSC Minnesota Stars.

In January 2017, Pérez joined MASL side Harrisburg Heat.

Career statistics
(correct as of 15 August 2010)

References

External links
 Official MySpace

1985 births
Living people
Sportspeople from Havana
Defecting Cuban footballers
Association football forwards
Cuban footballers
Cuba international footballers
2005 CONCACAF Gold Cup players
Miami FC (2006) players
Laredo Heat players
Atlético de San Juan FC players
Sevilla FC Puerto Rico players
Crystal Palace Baltimore players
Club Atlético River Plate Puerto Rico players
Puerto Rico Islanders players
Alianza F.C. footballers
C.D. Águila footballers
Fort Lauderdale Strikers players
SHB Da Nang FC players
Harrisburg Heat (MASL) players
Cuban expatriate footballers
Expatriate soccer players in the United States
Expatriate footballers in Puerto Rico
Expatriate footballers in El Salvador
Expatriate footballers in Vietnam
Cuban expatriate sportspeople in the United States
Cuban expatriate sportspeople in Puerto Rico
Cuban expatriate sportspeople in El Salvador
USSF Division 2 Professional League players
USL First Division players
USL League Two players
USL Championship players
North American Soccer League players
Major Arena Soccer League players